The Thomas Sloan Boyd House (also known as the Boyd-Barton House) is a historic house located at 220 Park Avenue in Lonoke, Arkansas.

Description and history 
It is a T-shaped, two-story brick structure, built out of locally-made bricks in about 1873 by Thomas Sloan Boyd, a local farmer. A full-height porch extends across the facade, supported by square brick columns, added in 1913.  It is the oldest brick building in the city.

The house was listed on the National Register of Historic Places on January 1, 1976.

See also
National Register of Historic Places listings in Lonoke County, Arkansas

References

Houses on the National Register of Historic Places in Arkansas
Houses completed in 1873
Houses in Lonoke County, Arkansas
National Register of Historic Places in Lonoke County, Arkansas
Buildings and structures in Lonoke, Arkansas